Robert Scott (born 1 March 1969) is a former Australian rules footballer who played with the Geelong Football Club and North Melbourne in the AFL.

As part of John Devine's recruiting drive that would yield good results in the future, Scott was recruited from Torquay, Victoria.
Starting as a goal sneak earlier in his career, he used his blistering pace to speed away from opponents to kick goals. As he matured and gained fitness, he was using sparingly in the midfield.

He once famously had a set shot after the siren to win the match for Geelong against Sydney Swans at Kardinia Park, but hit the post, resulting in a 3-point loss.

At the end of 1994, Scott was traded from Geelong to North Melbourne, with Geelong receiving Brad Sholl in return.

He played in North Melbourne's 1996 Premiership Victory, after having played in losing Grand Finals with Geelong in 1989 and 1992.

Scott would experience Grand Final defeat in 1998 as North Melbourne lost to the Adelaide Crows.

In 1999, Scott would miss out on selection for the Kangaroos eventual Grand Final victory over Carlton. According to Captain Wayne Carey post-match, was "very unlucky to miss out".

Statistics

|-
|- style="background-color: #EAEAEA"
! scope="row" style="text-align:center" | 1986
|style="text-align:center;"|
| 50 || 2 || 0 || 1 || 3 || 4 || 7 || 0 ||  || 0.0 || 0.5 || 1.5 || 2.0 || 3.5 || 0.0 ||  || 0
|-
! scope="row" style="text-align:center" | 1987
|style="text-align:center;"|
| 45 || 12 || 10 || 5 || 115 || 65 || 180 || 28 || 27 || 0.8 || 0.4 || 9.6 || 5.4 || 15.0 || 2.3 || 2.3 || 1
|- style="background-color: #EAEAEA"
! scope="row" style="text-align:center" | 1988
|style="text-align:center;"|
| 8 || 20 || 15 || 22 || 272 || 147 || 419 || 52 || 33 || 0.8 || 1.1 || 13.6 || 7.4 || 21.0 || 2.6 || 1.7 || 7
|-
! scope="row" style="text-align:center" | 1989
|style="text-align:center;"|
| 8 || 23 || 42 || 24 || 217 || 176 || 393 || 66 || 43 || 1.8 || 1.0 || 9.4 || 7.7 || 17.1 || 2.9 || 1.9 || 6
|- style="background-color: #EAEAEA"
! scope="row" style="text-align:center" | 1990
|style="text-align:center;"|
| 8 || 14 || 17 || 20 || 145 || 70 || 215 || 32 || 20 || 1.2 || 1.4 || 10.4 || 5.0 || 15.4 || 2.3 || 1.4 || 2
|-
! scope="row" style="text-align:center" | 1991
|style="text-align:center;"|
| 8 || 8 || 6 || 7 || 86 || 68 || 154 || 16 || 11 || 0.8 || 0.9 || 10.8 || 8.5 || 19.3 || 2.0 || 1.4 || 1
|- style="background-color: #EAEAEA"
! scope="row" style="text-align:center" | 1992
|style="text-align:center;"|
| 8 || 24 || 42 || 21 || 295 || 166 || 461 || 74 || 50 || 1.8 || 0.9 || 12.3 || 6.9 || 19.2 || 3.1 || 2.1 || 3
|-
! scope="row" style="text-align:center" | 1993
|style="text-align:center;"|
| 8 || 20 || 27 || 12 || 206 || 143 || 349 || 43 || 51 || 1.4 || 0.6 || 10.3 || 7.2 || 17.5 || 2.2 || 2.6 || 5
|- style="background-color: #EAEAEA"
! scope="row" style="text-align:center" | 1994
|style="text-align:center;"|
| 8 || 9 || 5 || 3 || 91 || 38 || 129 || 21 || 13 || 0.6 || 0.3 || 10.1 || 4.2 || 14.3 || 2.3 || 1.4 || 0
|-
! scope="row" style="text-align:center" | 1995
|style="text-align:center;"|
| 8 || 25 || 17 || 18 || 215 || 106 || 321 || 36 || 44 || 0.7 || 0.7 || 8.6 || 4.2 || 12.8 || 1.4 || 1.8 || 0
|- style="background-color: #EAEAEA"
|style="text-align:center;background:#afe6ba;"|1996†
|style="text-align:center;"|
| 8 || 24 || 13 || 9 || 219 || 132 || 351 || 47 || 50 || 0.5 || 0.4 || 9.1 || 5.5 || 14.6 || 2.0 || 2.1 || 1
|-
! scope="row" style="text-align:center" | 1997
|style="text-align:center;"|
| 8 || 25 || 14 || 15 || 216 || 140 || 356 || 49 || 35 || 0.6 || 0.6 || 8.6 || 5.6 || 14.2 || 2.0 || 1.4 || 3
|- style="background-color: #EAEAEA"
! scope="row" style="text-align:center" | 1998
|style="text-align:center;"|
| 8 || 22 || 6 || 3 || 193 || 76 || 269 || 27 || 43 || 0.3 || 0.1 || 8.8 || 3.5 || 12.2 || 1.2 || 2.0 || 1
|-
! scope="row" style="text-align:center" | 1999
|style="text-align:center;"|
| 8 || 16 || 8 || 4 || 83 || 38 || 121 || 19 || 16 || 0.5 || 0.3 || 5.2 || 2.4 || 7.6 || 1.2 || 1.0 || 0
|- style="background-color: #EAEAEA"
! scope="row" style="text-align:center" | 2000
|style="text-align:center;"|
| 8 || 1 || 0 || 0 || 0 || 0 || 0 || 0 || 1 || 0.0 || 0.0 || 0.0 || 0.0 || 0.0 || 0.0 || 1.0 || 0
|- class="sortbottom"
! colspan=3| Career
! 245
! 222
! 164
! 2356
! 1369
! 3725
! 510
! 437
! 0.9
! 0.7
! 9.6
! 5.6
! 15.2
! 2.1
! 1.8
! 30
|}

References

External links

1969 births
Australian rules footballers from Victoria (Australia)
North Melbourne Football Club players
North Melbourne Football Club Premiership players
Geelong Football Club players
Living people
Victorian State of Origin players
One-time VFL/AFL Premiership players